The Geroldsau Waterfall is a roughly six-metre-high waterfall on the Grobbach stream south of the Baden-Baden quarter of Geroldsau in the Northern Black Forest.

It flows northwards and merges before the waterfall with the Harzbach, which, together with its two tributaries, drains the northwestern slopes of the Badener Höhe. At the waterfall the Grobbach has an average flow rate of 0.56 m³/s. It drops here from about  down to about 285 m. into a small rock bowl. After about a kilometre the V-shaped valley widens into the broad valley bottom of Geroldsau. At its confluence with the Oos in Lichtental the Grobbach is bigger and longer than the Oos.

References

External links 

 Location of the Geroldsau Waterfall at: 
 Fact file on the Geroldsau Waterfall (pdf, 354 kByte) at the Landesamt für Geologie, Rohstoffe und Bergbau
 Geroldsau Waterfall – The favourite place in May by Brahms and Courbet, Baden-Baden Kur & Tourismus

Black Forest
Waterfalls of Germany
Natural monuments in Germany
Baden-Baden
WGeroldsau Waterfall